WTAW (1620 kHz), branded as "News Talk 1620 94.5 WTAW", is a commercial talk AM radio station licensed to serve College Station, Texas. Owned by the Bryan Broadcasting Company, WTAW covers College Station, Bryan and much of the Brazos Valley. Its studios and transmitter site are located in College Station.

In addition to a standard analog transmission, WTAW broadcasts in HD Radio, utilizing the in-band on-channel hybrid standard, is simulcast over low-power FM translator K233DU (94.5 FM) College Station, and is available online.

Programming

WTAW personality Scott DeLucia hosts the morning-drive program, The Infomaniacs along with Chelsea Reber on news and Zach Taylor on sports. The show is best known for quick wit and Zach being made fun of by the other hosts.

The Glenn Beck Program, The Clay Travis and Buck Sexton Show (a direct successor to The Rush Limbaugh Show), and The Sean Hannity Show (via Premiere Networks) air during the late morning, midday, and afternoons, respectively. Joe Pags (via Compass Media Networks), Coast to Coast AM (via Premiere) and This Morning, America's First News with Gordon Deal (via Compass) also air on the station. Weekend hosts include Kim Komando and Bill Cunningham.

History

KAZW / KZNE 

WTAW originated as the expanded band "twin" of an existing station on the standard AM band. On March 17, 1997 the Federal Communications Commission (FCC) announced that eighty-eight stations had been given permission to move to newly available "Expanded Band" transmitting frequencies, ranging from 1610 to 1700 kHz, with the then-WTAW on 1150 kHz authorized to move to 1620 kHz. An application for the expanded band station was filed on June 16, 1997, which on January 9, 1998 was assigned the call letters KAZW, which were changed on March 1, 2000 to KZNE.

The FCC's initial policy was that both the original station and its expanded band counterpart could operate simultaneously for up to five years, after which owners would have to turn in one of the two licenses, depending on whether they preferred the new assignment or elected to remain on the original frequency. However, this deadline has been extended multiple times, and the stations on both 1150 and 1620 kHz have remained authorized. One restriction is that the FCC has generally required paired original and expanded band stations to remain under common ownership.

WTAW 

On May 3, 2000 the stations on 1150 and 1620 kHz swapped identities, with 1150 becoming sports radio KZNE (while maintaining its longtime role as the flagship of Texas A&M Aggies athletics), and 1620 inheriting the historic WTAW call letters and its talk radio format. Although for the average listener this meant that WTAW had moved from 1150 to 1620 kHz, and KNZE had done the reverse, according to FCC regulatory practices the same station on 1620 kHz continued to be licensed (Facility ID 87145 in FCC nomenclature), with just call letter changes taking place.

On December 4, 2003, WTAW and KZNE were sold to Bryan Broadcasting.

References

External links

µ
News and talk radio stations in the United States
Radio stations established in 2000
2000 establishments in Texas